Benjamin Cutter (Woburn, Massachusetts September 6, 1857 – Boston May 10, 1910) was an American violinist and composer. He studied at the Stuttgart Conservatory in Germany, was later a member of the Boston Symphony Orchestra, then taught at the New England Conservatory of Music. His compositional output was mainly chamber music, but he wrote some cantatas and church music as well. He published several pedagogical books on violin playing and music theory.

Life and career
Cutter was the eldest child of Ephraim Cutter, a prominent physician and musical amateur, and his wife Rebecca Smith.  Ephraim was an elder brother of William Richard Cutter, the prominent genealogist, who was therefore Benjamin's uncle, despite being just ten years older. After violin study with Julius Eichberg, founder of the Boston Conservatory of Music, Cutter went to Germany, where he studied at the Stuttgart Conservatory under Edmund Singer  and Percy Goetschius. He was a member of the Boston Symphony Orchestra from 1881-1885, and from 1888 was on the faculty of the New England Conservatory, where he taught violin, viola, harmony, composition, and theory. According to his contemporary Louis Elson, Cutter’s work “as a teacher . . . averages very high, and he has graduated hundreds of pupils.” Among those students were Florence Price and Oscar Anderson Fuller. Cutter published several practical pedagogical works for violin and in music theory. From 1890-93, Cutter was also on the editorial staff of The Musical Herald.

Selected compositions

Chamber music
 Eine Liebes-Novelle (A Love Story), 5 Bagatelles for viola and piano, Op. 20 (1894). Score.
 Trio in A minor for violin, cello and piano, Op. 24 (1894)

Vocal
 What Means That Star?, Christmas Song for mezzo-soprano or contralto and piano (1893), words by James Russell Lowell
 The Douglas Tragedy, a ballad from the traditional Scotch, Op. 19
 Hymn to the North-East Wind for male chorus, Op. 35 (1896), words by Charles Kingsley
 Sir Patrick Spens, ballad for chorus and orchestra, Op. 36 (1896)
 Mass in D for soli, unison chorus and organ (1898)

Publications
The First Steps in Violin Playing. New England Conservatory Music Store, Boston, 1882.
How to Study Kreutzer: A Handbook for the Daily Use of Violin Teachers and Violin Students.  Boston: Oliver Ditson, 1903.
Exercises in Harmony [“Supplementary to the Treatise on Harmony by G. W. Chadwick”]. Boston: New England Conservatory of Music, 1899. 11th edition, 1911. 
Harmonic Analysis. Boston: Oliver Ditson, 1902.

Harmonic Analysis
Cutter’s concise textbook in harmonic analysis was intended “for those who have studied Harmony and would apply it in their every-day musical life—in other words, in their playing and in their teaching” (v). In particular, he promotes the value of harmonic reduction, as it can make “Playing by Memory and Playing at Sight easier to learn.” Since “a piece of figurated music is always built on a plain harmonic structure, [the student will learn] that this harmonic structure is a concrete thing; that it may be taken hold of, as it were; may be played by itself, giving a good idea of the whole.” Thus, “in playing from memory there is given to the player a greater assurance, if he knows that at a certain point he is to use such and such a chord, or go to such a key” (80-81).
The basic method of harmonic reduction is that “the extreme notes of the florid phrase must be brought into proper vocal compass, after which the inner parts may be added, . . . although occasional breaks in the leading may be unavoidable in the compression of a very florid structure” (8, 83).

References

1857 births
1910 deaths
19th-century classical composers
20th-century classical composers
American male classical composers
American classical composers
People from Woburn, Massachusetts
State University of Music and Performing Arts Stuttgart alumni
19th-century American composers
20th-century American male musicians
19th-century American male musicians